Sir Irving James Albery (12 May 1879 – 14 November 1967) was a Conservative Party politician in the United Kingdom who served as Member of Parliament (MP) for Gravesend from 1924 to 1945.

Biography
The eldest of three sons of actress and theatrical manager Mary Moore (later Lady Wyndham) and actor James Albery Albery first stood for Parliament at the 1923 general election, when he unsuccessfully contested the Labour Party safe seat of Bow and Bromley in the East End of London. His youngest brother Wyndham went into politics and middle brother, Bronson, became a theatre manager.

At the 1929 general election, he was elected as MP for the Gravesend constituency in Kent, defeating the Labour MP George Isaacs, who had won the seat in 1923 with a majority only 119 votes.

Albery held the Gravesend seat for 21 years, until his own defeat at the 1945 general election by the Labour candidate Garry Allighan. Allighan was expelled from the House of Commons two years later, but Albery (by then 68 years old) did not contest the resulting by-election in November 1947, when Labour's Richard Acland held the seat with a reduced majority.

He was knighted in the King's Birthday Honours, 1936, for "political and public services".

He married Gertrude Mary Jones (1884–1967) and they had three children. Their eldest child and only daughter Jessica Albery was an architect and town planner, one of the first professional women architects in the UK in the early 20th century.

References

External links 
 

1879 births
1967 deaths
Conservative Party (UK) MPs for English constituencies
Knights Bachelor
UK MPs 1924–1929
UK MPs 1929–1931
UK MPs 1931–1935
UK MPs 1935–1945